The Weill Cornell Graduate School of Medical Sciences (WCGS) (formerly known as the Cornell University Graduate School of Medical Sciences) is a graduate college of Cornell University that was founded in 1952 as an academic partnership between two major medical institutions in New York City: the Weill Cornell Medical College and the Sloan Kettering Institute.  Cornell is involved in the Tri-Institutional MD-PhD Program with Rockefeller University and the Sloan Kettering Institute; each of these three institutions is part of a large biomedical center extending along York Avenue between 65th and 72nd Streets on the Upper East Side of Manhattan.

Programs of study
Weill Cornell Graduate School of Medical Sciences (WCGS) partners with neighboring institutions along York Avenue, also known as the “corridor of science” in New York City. Such partnerships with Memorial Sloan Kettering Cancer Center, New York-Presbyterian Hospital, the Hospital for Special Surgery and The Rockefeller University offer specialized learning opportunities.

WCGS offers a variety of programs at both the Masters and Doctoral levels. As a partnership between the Sloan Kettering Institute and Weill Cornell Medical College, WCGS offers seven PhD programs as well as four distinct Masters programs. Additionally, the school offers two Tri-Institutional PhDs, a Tri-Institutional MD/PhD and the opportunity for students to participate in an Accelerated PhD/MBA program.

PhD Programs:
 Biochemistry and Structural Biology
 Molecular Biology
 Cell and Developmental Biology
 Immunology and Microbial Pathogenesis
 Pharmacology
 Neuroscience
 Physiology Biophysics and Systems Biology

Tri-Institutional PhD Programs
 Chemical Biology
 Computational Biology and Medicine
 Tri-I MD / PhD Program

See also
 Weill Cornell Medical College
 Tri-Institutional MD-PhD Program

References

Universities and colleges in Manhattan
Colleges and schools of Cornell University
1952 establishments in New York City
Cornell University campuses
Biomedicine